The Circle Digital Chart, known as the Gaon Digital Chart until its July 2022 rebranding, is a chart that ranks the best-performing singles in South Korea. Managed by the domestic Ministry of Culture, Sports and Tourism (MCST), its data is compiled by the Korea Music Content Industry Association and published by the Circle Chart. The ranking is based collectively on each single's download sales, stream count, and background music use. The Circle Chart provides weekly (listed from Sunday to Saturday), monthly, and yearly lists for the chart.

Following the announcement of the data for week 27 and the monthly chart of June, the Gaon Digital Chart was rebranded to the Circle Digital Chart, in line with Gaon's rebranding to Circle.

Weekly charts

Monthly charts

References

External links
 Current Circle Digital Chart 

2021 singles
Korea, South singles
2022 in South Korean music